Dwumfour is a surname. Notable people with this surname include:
 Michael Dwumfour (born 1998), American football player
 Randy Dwumfour (born 2000), Ghanaian footballer